The Order of St George, was the first secular chivalric order in the world and was established by King Charles I of Hungary in 1326. It continues to exist today as the International Knightly Order Valiant of St. George, with Grand Priories in the United States and the United Kingdom.

History of the Order
The Order was founded by King Charles I of Hungary as the Fraternal Society of Knighthood of St George. The precise date of its foundation is not known, but based on the text of its Statutes, it was in existence on St George's Day, 23 April 1326. The order flourished during Charles' reign and achieved greater success under the reign of his son Louis I of Hungary. After the death of Louis, the Hungarian throne became the subject of a violent dispute between his relations, and the Hungarian kingdom dissolved into civil war, destroying the original Society. All that is known about the Order in terms of its mission, composition, obligations and activities has been obtained from the only surviving artifact which describes the Society.

Based on the Statutes, although the Society of St George was a political and honorary body, Charles infused the ideals of chivalry into the Society promoting them among the lesser nobles of his kingdom and implementing the classic symbol of chivalry, the knights' tournament, in Hungarian festivals of chivalry. Unlike the ecclesiastical Orders of the period, members of the Society wore a black, knee-length, hooded mantle, bearing not an heraldic device but an inscription: 

The Statutes were written in Latin, the language of learned writing in Hungary before the 19th century, and are about 1700 words long, in the form of letters patent. Suspended from the document was the great seal of the Society with the classic iconic representation of St George mounted on a horse slaying the dragon under the horse's hooves as shown on the right. The document is currently housed in the Országos Levéltar (National Archives of Hungary), DL. 40 483. There are a number of transcriptions and translations of the Statutes, facilitating study.

In Hungary, the twentieth century foundation the Order of Vitéz was based upon the Order of St. George, but the Knightly Order Valiant of St George re-emerged in its own right after the fall of communism in 1989.

Modern times 
The Order continues to exist today as the International Knightly Order Valiant of St. George (commonly simply referred to by the original name, the Order of St. George). The Order has charitable status in the UK as Registered Charity No. 1137397, in the USA as a 501(c)3 non-profit organisation, and with the United Nations as an organisation with Special Consultative Status with the UN Economic & Social Council (ECOSOC) since 2015.

Current classes 
The four classes of appointment to the Order are, in descending order of precedence:

 Grand Cross of the International Knightly Order Valiant of St. George (GCStG)
 Knight/Dame Commander of the International Knightly Order Valiant of St. George (KCStG/DCStG)
 Knight/Dame of the International Knightly Order Valiant of St. George (KStG/DStG)
 Officer of the International Knightly Order Valiant of St. George (OStG)
 Squire of the International Knightly Order Valiant of St. George (EsqStG)

References

Further reading
 Fügedi, Erik: Ispánok, bárók, kiskirályok (Counts, Barons and Petty Kings); Magvető Könyvkiadó, 1986, Budapest; .
 Kristó, Gyula (editor): Korai Magyar Történeti Lexikon - 9-14. század (Encyclopedia of Early Hungarian History - 9-14th centuries)''; Akadémiai Kiadó, 1994, Budapest; .

14th-century establishments in Hungary
Hungarian nobility
Orders of chivalry of Hungary
1326 establishments in Europe